Provincial Trunk Highway 45 (PTH 45) is a provincial highway in the southwest region of the Canadian province of Manitoba.

PTH 45 provides an alternate route to Riding Mountain National Park for travelers coming from Saskatchewan and the western part of Manitoba as opposed to taking the Yellowhead Highway to Minnedosa and PTH 10 north.

PTH 45 is officially named the Russell Subdivision Trail. The speed limit is 100 km/h (62.5 mph).

History
When the highway was first designated in 1959, PTH 45 was dubbed derisively by some locals as "The Turkey Trail". This was due to its narrow and winding nature at the time, which resembled the winding bush paths commonly found on Prairie farms. This, along with some very sharp curves in the western section between Elphinstone and Russell, increased the amount of travel time along this route. By 1966, the highway had been realigned to closely follow the Canadian Pacific Railway (CPR) alternate line, removing the sharp curves and unnecessary turns and allowing the highway to be more streamlined for safer travel.

Major intersections

References

External links 
Manitoba Official Map - Western Manitoba

045